Asma Barlas (born 10 March 1950) is a Pakistani-American writer and academic.  Her specialties include comparative and international politics, Islam and Qur'anic hermeneutics, and women's studies.

Early life and education
Barlas was born in Pakistan in 1950. She earned a bachelor of arts in English literature and philosophy from Kinnaird College and a master's degree in journalism from the University of the Punjab. She also holds a master's degree and Ph.D. in international studies from the University of Denver.

Career 

Barlas was one of the first women to be inducted into the foreign service in 1976. Six years later, she was dismissed on the orders of General Zia ul Haq. She worked briefly as assistant editor of the opposition newspaper The Muslim before receiving political asylum in the United States in 1983.

Barlas joined the politics department of Ithaca College in 1991. She was the founding director of the Center for the Study of Culture, Race, and Ethnicity for 12 years. She held Spinoza Chair in Philosophy at the University of Amsterdam in 2008.

Research 
Barlas has focused on the way Muslims produce religious knowledge, especially patriarchal exegesis of the Qur'an, a topic she has explored in her book, "Believing Women" in Islam: Unreading Patriarchal Interpretations of the Qur'an.

She rejects the designation of her views and interpretations of Islam as "Islamic feminism," unless that term is defined as "a discourse of gender equality and social justice that derives its understanding and mandate from the Qur'an and seeks the practice of rights and justice for all human beings in the totality of their existence across the public-private continuum."

In her first book, Democracy, Nationalism and Communalism: The Colonial Legacy in South Asia, Barlas explored the relationship of militarism in Pakistani politics to British colonialism.

Works

Books

 Islam, Muslims, and the US: Essays on Religion and Politics (India, Global Media Publications, 2004)
"Believing Women" in Islam: Unreading Patriarchal Interpretations of the Qur'an (University of Texas Press, 2002).
 Democracy, Nationalism, and Communalism: The Colonial Legacy in South Asia (Westview Press, 1995)
Confronting Qur'anic Patriarchy (University of Texas Press, 2018) (forthcoming) (co-written with Raeburn Finn) ??
"Believing Women" in Islam: Unreading Patriarchal Interpretations of the Qur'an (Revised edition. University of Texas Press, February 2019)

Essays
"Reviving Islamic Universalism: East/s, West/s, and Coexistence," in Abdul Aziz Said and Meena Sharify-Funk (eds.), Contemporary Islam: Dynamic, Not Static (Routledge, 2006).
 "Women's and Feminist Readings of the Qur'an," in Jane Dammen McAuliffe (ed.), Cambridge Companion to the Qur'an (Cambridge University Press, 2006).
"Globalizing Equality: Muslim Women, Theology, and Feminisms," in Fera Simone (ed.), On Shifting Ground: Muslim Women in the Global Era (NY: Feminist Press, 2005).
"Amina Wadud's Hermeneutics of the Qur'an: Women Rereading Sacred Texts," in Suha Taji-Faruqi (ed.), Contemporary Muslim Intellectuals and the Quran: Modernist and Post Modernist Approaches (Oxford: Oxford University Press, 2004).

See also 
 Fatema Mernissi
Ziba Mir-Hosseini
Azizah Y. al-Hibri
 Amina Wadud
 Islamic feminism

References

External links
 Personal website
 Ithaca College Faculty: Asma Barlas
 Bio of Asma Barlas
 "It Is the Right for Every Muslim to Interpret the Quran for Themselves" (Interview)
 Only Muslims can change their society Article in Guardian, August 2009
 Islam and feminism Article in the newstatesman, April 2009
 Interview: "The Qur’an Doesn’t Support Patriarchy" Interview by Naufil Shahrukh, published in ABC, The Nation, Pakistan, February 2005
 Towards a feminist view of Islam

1950 births
American feminist writers
Proponents of Islamic feminism
Ithaca College faculty
Living people
Josef Korbel School of International Studies people
Pakistani emigrants to the United States
Pakistani feminists
Women scholars of Islam
American Islamic studies scholars
Kinnaird College for Women University alumni
University of the Punjab alumni
University of Denver alumni